General Hospital: Night Shift, stylized as NIGHTSHIFT, is an American prime time serial that first aired on Soapnet for a 27-episode run from July 12, 2007, to October 21, 2008. A spin-off of the ABC Daytime soap opera General Hospital, the show is SOAPnet's first original scripted drama series and follows the nighttime adventures of familiar and new characters around the hospital. As of March 2008, the first season of the series was "SOAPnet's most watched series ever," with ABC Daytime and SOAPnet President Brian Frons noting that Night Shift drew more than 1 million new viewers to the channel during its first season. With its reruns gaining higher ratings than those of General Hospital on SOAPnet, a second season was expected, though Frons noted that the same crew producing two shows had taken its toll.

It was announced in May 2008 that Lisa de Cazotte would serve as Executive producer for season two, joined by Head writer Sri Rao. The 14 new episodes of Night Shift began taping in high-definition in June 2008, with the series airing Tuesdays at 11 p.m. and premiering on July 22, 2008. SOAPnet said the second season "will feature new and returning characters as well as the return of 'legacy' characters from GH. In addition, the continuity between story lines on Night Shift and GH will match." The second season finished its run on October 21, 2008.

Night Shift is the second spin-off series for General Hospital, the first being the 30-minute daytime serial Port Charles, which ran on ABC from June 1997 to October 2003.

Season two of Night Shift also aired on DirecTV's The 101 Network in 2008.

Overview
Prior to its premiere, SOAPnet had announced that Night Shift would "delve deeper into the relationships, friendships and medical cases seen at the hospital."  It was noted that unlike General Hospital itself, the stories on Night Shift would be "self-contained and wrap up during each weekly one-hour episode," as well as being "understandable to viewers who do not watch General Hospital." With the goal "to attract younger viewers to both SOAPnet and General Hospital," characters would be "plucked from General Hospital's history" and "be mostly  younger characters with ties to GH core families." Night Shift storylines, however, did not directly intersect with those on General Hospital.

Cast

Season one

Contract

Guest

Season two

Contract

Guest
{| class="wikitable"  
|- bgcolor="#CCCCCC"
! Actor || Character
|-
|Chad Allen || Eric Whitlow
|-
|Cameron Boyce || Michael "Stone" Cates Jr.
|-
|Leslie Charleson || Dr. Monica Quartermaine
|-
|Anthony Geary<ref name="TV Guide 2008-10-08">{{cite web |url=http://www.tvguide.com/Soaps/General-Hospital-preview-20014.aspx |title=Inside Night Shift'''s Emotional GH Reunion |access-date=2008-10-17 |last=Mitovich |first=Matt |date=October 8, 2008 |work=TV Guide |publisher=TVGuide.com |url-status=dead |archive-url=https://web.archive.org/web/20081011033620/http://www.tvguide.com/Soaps/General-Hospital-preview-20014.aspx |archive-date=October 11, 2008 }}</ref> || Luke Spencer
|-
|Finola Hughes || Anna Devane
|-
|Kathleen Noone || Patricia Julian
|-
|John Reilly || Sean Donely
|-
|Sharon Wyatt || Tiffany Hill
|-
|John J. York || Mac Scorpio
|}

 Episodes 
 Season 1 (2007) 

Season 2 (2008)

Ratings history

The premiere episode of Night Shift ranked as the SOAPnet's "most viewed telecast ever" with total viewers and in its target demographic, women age 18–49. The show was also SOAPnet's most watched premiere with those groups and with women 18–34. According to Nielsen Media Research, the series averaged 1 million total viewers, "posting 63% audience growth over its lead-in," and ranking as "the second most viewed cable program for the hour with women 18-49." Broadcasting & Cable notes the significance of this fact considering "only 64 million homes carry the network, compared to the 94 million that carry USA, the top network in the demo that night." Night Shift doubled SOAPnet's time-period viewership from 2006 in total viewers and the women 18-49 demographic. The series averaged 833,000 viewers (and 381,000 among women 18–49) during its first season.

Reception

Season one
In 2007, soap opera critic Marlena De Lacroix noted the initially high ratings but called the series an "incoherently written and produced mess," going on to declare that "Night Shift only redeeming aspect and its real legacy to daytime is its bravura casting. Casting directors Mark Teschner and Gwen Hillier introduced a group of new actors who are universally talented and interesting. No brainless hunk or hunkette models typically hired en masse." In 2008, Ed Martin called the first season "a perfectly putrid spin-off of a soap opera that is now a mere shadow of its fantastic former self."

Season two
Martin called the second season "a sophomore series that embodied almost everything that was sublime about its mother-ship back in its heyday." Michael Logan of TV Guide wrote in October 2008 that although he did not enjoy the premiere episode of season two, "then the show got good. Really good." He ranked the spin-off above General Hospital itself, saying "it's indisputably superior to the mob-infested soap that spawned it." Logan added that "This late-night SOAPnet series is refreshingly retro, focusing as GH once did on the lives of doctors and their patients. (Imagine that!) The pleasures are many, from the frisky interplay of interns Claire and Kyle (she's straight, he's not) to the profoundly moving performances of Finola Hughes and Tristan Rogers as Anna and her cancer-stricken Robert." Michael Fairman called Rogers' performance "poignant" and noted that "if it could have been in Emmy contention this year, it would stand among the best." Rogers himself said of the season, "Night Shift was a wonderful glimpse of what was possible to do with a daytime format and a prime time format, shot in HD, edited like a movie, and essentially brought up to date, which was subtle. It was written by Sri Rao, who really understood the genre. He really got it ... I think this is an issue of what goes on with the daytime soaps. There are not too many people out there now who want to take what history there is, and take it and build on it. I can see why they don’t want to do that, but on the other hand, I don’t think there is much point in changing history for the sake of change. If you have a really good reason to change it then do it, otherwise use it!" De Lacroix wrote that season two "expertly delivered traditional soap opera in a modern form while reinforcing love as the center  of the medium, instead of devaluing it as so many soaps do today," adding that "All the characters on NS2 were intelligent adults, the way they used to be on soap operas before about a decade ago when most characters were rendered brainless and stupid."

DVD release
The complete first season of Night Shift'' was released on DVD on February 12, 2008.

References

External links
 Official site
 GH: Night Shift - SoapCentral.com

2007 American television series debuts
2008 American television series endings
2000s American drama television series
2000s American medical television series
American television soap operas
American television spin-offs
English-language television shows
General Hospital
Soapnet original programming
Television series by Disney–ABC Domestic Television